In linguistics, the Japhetic theory of Soviet linguist Nikolay Yakovlevich Marr (1864–1934) postulated that the Kartvelian languages of the Caucasus area are related to the Semitic languages of the Middle East. The theory gained favor among some Soviet linguists for ideological reasons, as it was thought to represent "proletarian science" as opposed to "bourgeois science".

Term
Marr adopted the term "Japhetic" from Japheth, the name of one of the sons of Noah, in order to characterise his theory that the Kartvelian languages of the Caucasus area were related to the Semitic languages of the Middle East (named after Shem, Japheth's brother). Marr postulated a common origin of Caucasian, Semitic-Hamitic, and Basque languages. This initial theory pre-dated the October Revolution (the reference is made in Pan Tadeusz written by Adam Mickiewicz in the 1830s). In 1917, Marr enthusiastically endorsed the revolution, and offered his services to the new Soviet regime. He was soon accepted as the country's leading linguist.

Theory
Under the Soviet government, Marr developed his theory to claim that Japhetic languages had existed across Europe before the advent of the Indo-European languages. They could still be recognised as a substratum over which the Indo-European languages had imposed themselves. Using this model, Marr attempted to apply the Marxist theory of class struggle to linguistics, arguing that these different strata of language corresponded to different social classes. He stated that the same social classes in widely different countries spoke versions of their own languages that were linguistically closer to one another than to the speech of other classes who supposedly spoke “the same” language. This aspect of Marr's thinking was an attempt to extend the Marxist theory of international class consciousness far beyond its original meaning, by trying to apply it to language. Marr also insisted that the notion that a people are united by common language was nothing more than false consciousness created by “bourgeois nationalism”.

To draw support for his speculative doctrine, Marr elaborated a Marxist footing for it. He hypothesized that modern languages tend to fuse into a single language of communist society. This theory was the basis for a mass campaign of "Latinisation" in the 1920s and 1930s to replace the existing Cyrillic alphabets of minority languages with Latin alphabets.

Obtaining recognition of his theory from Soviet officials, Marr was permitted to manage the National Library of Russia from 1926 until 1930 and the Japhetic Institute of the Academy of Sciences from 1921 until his death in 1934. He was elected Vice-President of the Soviet Academy of Sciences in 1930.

In 1950, sixteen years after Marr's death, an article titled "Marxism and Problems of Linguistics" was published in major Soviet periodicals under the byline of Joseph Stalin. It was at least inspired by the writings of Marr's most energetic opponent, Arnold Chikobava, and some sources suggest that most of the text had actually been ghost-written by Chikobava or pieced together from Chikobava's official report to Stalin. The author writes that "N. Ya. Marr introduced into linguistics another and also incorrect and non-Marxist formula, regarding the ‘class character’ of language, and got himself into a muddle and put linguistics into a muddle. Soviet linguistics cannot be advanced on the basis of an incorrect formula which is contrary to the whole course of the history of peoples and languages." Since then, the Japhetic theory has been seen as deeply flawed, both inside and outside the former Soviet Union, but some of Marr's surviving students continued to defend and develop it into the late 1960s.

See also 
 Georgy Danilov
 Dené-Caucasian languages
 Khazar theory
 Lemurian Tamil
 Lysenkoism
 Proto-language
 Sun Language Theory

References

External links 

The Soviet Linguistic Theory (chapter 4 of Roman Smal-Stocki, The Nationality Problem of the Soviet Union): a hostile but thorough exposition of Japhetic theory.

Obsolete scientific theories
Pseudohistory

Science and technology in the Soviet Union
Soviet phraseology
Pseudoscience
Historical linguistics
Pseudolinguistics